Joelma das Neves Sousa (born 13 July 1984) is a Brazilian sprinter who specializes in the 400 metres. She represented Brazil at the 2012 and 2016 Summer Olympics.

Achievements

References

External links

 
 Tilastopaja biography

1984 births
Living people
Brazilian female sprinters
Sportspeople from Maranhão
Athletes (track and field) at the 2012 Summer Olympics
Athletes (track and field) at the 2016 Summer Olympics
Olympic athletes of Brazil
Pan American Games medalists in athletics (track and field)
Pan American Games silver medalists for Brazil
South American Games gold medalists for Brazil
South American Games bronze medalists for Brazil
South American Games medalists in athletics
Athletes (track and field) at the 2011 Pan American Games
Competitors at the 2014 South American Games
Medalists at the 2011 Pan American Games
Troféu Brasil de Atletismo winners
Olympic female sprinters
21st-century Brazilian women